is a Japanese slalom canoer who has competed since the mid-2000s. She finished fourth in the K-1 event at the 2008 Summer Olympics in Beijing.

External links
 Sports-Reference.com profile
 

1988 births
Canoeists at the 2008 Summer Olympics
Japanese female canoeists
Living people
Olympic canoeists of Japan
Canoeists at the 2018 Asian Games
Asian Games competitors for Japan
Sportspeople from Tokyo Metropolis
People from Fussa, Tokyo